Club Deportivo Altorricón is a Spanish football team based in Altorricón, in the autonomous community of Aragón. Founded in 1930, it plays in Regional Preferente, holding home games at Municipal, with a 2,000-seat capacity.

Season to season

3 seasons in Tercera División

External links
Official website 
futbolaragon.com profile 

Football clubs in Aragon
Association football clubs established in 1930
Divisiones Regionales de Fútbol clubs
1935 establishments in Spain